The Lamentation of Christ (also known as the Lamentation over the Dead Christ, or the Dead Christ and other variants) is a painting of about 1480 by the Italian Renaissance artist Andrea Mantegna.  While the dating of the piece is debated, it was completed between 1475 and 1501, probably in the early 1480s. It portrays the body of Christ supine on a marble slab. He is watched over by the Virgin Mary, Saint John and St. Mary Magdalene weeping for his death.

Mantegna may have made this painting for his personal funerary chapel. It was found by his sons in his studio after his death and sold off to pay debts. The painting is now in the Pinacoteca di Brera of Milan, Italy.

Theme 
The theme of the Lamentation of Christ is common in medieval and Renaissance art, although this treatment, dating back to a subject known as the Anointing of Christ, is unusual for the period.  Most Lamentations show much more contact between the mourners and the body.  Rich contrasts of light and shadow abound, infused by a profound sense of pathos. The realism and tragedy of the scene are enhanced by the perspective, which foreshortens and dramatizes the recumbent figure, stressing the anatomical details: in particular, Christ's thorax. The holes in Christ's hands and feet, as well as the faces of the two mourners, are portrayed without any concession to idealism or rhetoric. The sharply drawn drapery which covers the corpse contributes to the dramatic effect. The composition places the central focus of the image on Christ's genitals – an emphasis often found in figures of Jesus, especially as an infant, in this period, which has been related to a theological emphasis on the Humanity of Jesus by Leo Steinberg and others. The space the figures are present in appears to be confined, small, and somber, indicating to be a morgue.

Content and Analysis 
By the way Christ is painted, viewers have difficulty in pinpointing the real dimensions of Christ’s body. His rather large torso, hands and feet are depicted to be closer to the spectators, it is hard to tell the size of his proportions. Art historian Hubert Schrade points out, “the agitation of dimension of the work, which allows immediate proximity but denies any intimacy.” Mantegna also reduced the size of the figure's feet, which would cover much of the body if represented true to size. German scholar Hans Jantzen suggests the painting has a orthogonal perspective, a perspective he believed to be of the highest meaningful value. 

Being placed at eye level at Christ’s feet, directly in front of his open wounds, invites the viewers to remember the reason for his death. Mantegna presented both a harrowing study of a strongly foreshortened cadaver and an intensely poignant depiction of a biblical tragedy. The portrayal of Jesus Christ's suffering prior to this event is meant to inspire not only pain, but hope. The idea of scherzo, a musical term referring to the lighthearted, playful segment of a symphony, is present in this scene, invoking slight lightness, hope, and promise in anticipation of Christ's future resurrection. The painting is another mirror to the Middle Ages inscriptions on images related to a Christ on the cross or the Passion of the Lord that would say, “Aspice qui transis, quia tu mihi causa doloris (look here, you who are passing by, for you are the cause of my pain).” In addition to being in front of his open injuries, the fabric Christ lies on indicates that this is the time to mourn before he is to be buried. The stone Christ lies on is also known as the Stone of Unction, or the Stone of Anointing, and is the slab onto which Christ's body was laid after being crucified. Viewers are meant to feel that they cannot reach out and touch his body, Shrade noted: "None of the mourners dare touch the corpse, He is untouchable."

One symbolic meaning of a subject being presented feet first in perspective is to indicate that the individual has lost a battle or war. However, it is usually meant to imply that the individual is a degenerate or a loser affected by unfortunate events, such as a flood, or misfortune. This is especially used as imagery for those who were denied of holy or divine protection. Here, however, Mantegna paints one of the most holy figures in such a position. The feet are also considered the lowest parts of the human body, and present among the individuals in the painting is Mary Magdalene, who washed Christ's feet with her tears and hair as an act of deep respect and a plea for forgiveness.

In the painting, Christ’s head is somewhat turned away from Mary, John, and Mary Magdalene to face the direction of the illumination. This is depicted to symbolize the teachings and promise of God when one is nearing the end of her or his lifespan.

Notes

Sources
 La Grande Storia dell'Arte – Il Quattrocento, Il Sole 24 Ore, 2005
 Kleiner, Frank S. Gardner's Art Through the Ages, 13th Edition, 2008
 Manca, Joseph. Andrea Mantegna and the Italian Renaissance, 2006
Andrea Mantegna: Making Art (History). United Kingdom: Wiley, 2015.
Johnston, Kenneth G. "Hemingway and Mantegna: The Bitter Nail Holes." The Journal of Narrative Technique 1, no. 2 (1971): 86–94. Accessed November 19, 2020. http://www.jstor.org/stable/30224967.

 

Lamentation over the Dead Christ, The
Lamentation over the Dead Christ, The
Lamentation over the Dead Christ
Mantegna
Paintings of the Virgin Mary
Christian art about death
Paintings depicting Mary Magdalene